Ardonis dentifera is a moth in the family Geometridae. It is found on New Guinea.

References

Moths described in 1906
Eupitheciini
Moths of New Guinea